Francis Hewat Taylor (22 February 1920 - 2004) was a Scottish-born Australia actor known for his long running portrayal of Sgt. Andrew "Scotty" Macleod in the television series Division 4. He appeared in every one of the show's 301 episodes becoming a well known television personality.

Early life
Taylor was born in Kirkhill in Scotland and was educated at the Edinburgh Academy and the Scottish School of Drama. His professional debut as an actor was as the Second Page in Richard of Bordeaux at the Lyceum Theatre, Edinburgh, in September 1938.

War Service
During World War II Taylor joined the Royal Air Force and served for five years as a Wireless operator and Air gunner with Squadron 608 and Squadron 217. He was shot shot down and taken as a prisoner in February 1942 and was incarcerated in seven Prisoner of war camps before being liberated on 2 May 1945 by the British 2nd Army 11th Armoured Division.

Australian career
After settling permanently in Sydney in 1952 Taylor appeared in productions of plays by Brendan Behan and William Shakespeare and contemporary drama productions, including The Hostage, Henry V, Difference of Opinion and for the Old Tote Theatre Company in The Caucasian Chalk Circle and Heartbreak House. He appeared in Under Milk Wood at the Independent Theatre in North Sydney. He played the role of Martin Elliot in the television production of The Affair and of Wilson in The Sundowners. He also appeared in many of the early landmark television series in Australia before being cast in Crawford Productions police series Division 4. Taylor read and recorded over 400 books for the Royal Blind Society of NSW audio book collection. He retired in the late 1980s.

Awards
In 1972 Taylor received the Penguin Award for the Best Supporting Actor in a Television Series.

Autobiography
In 1988 Taylor wrote an autobiography entitled Barbed Wire and Footlights – Seven Stalags to Freedom.

Personal life
Taylor married the Sydney born zoologist Pauline Gladys Larcombe in 1954. The couple had two daughters, Marjorie and Gillian, and lived in the substantial Victorian era home "Hazelhurst" at 15 Ethel Street, Burwood, New South Wales. Pauline Taylor’s mother Mrs W.F.A. Larcombe lived next door in the heritage listed "Landsdowne" and the two houses and tennis court, on multiple blocks of land, formed a family compound for over 50 years. Taylor died in 2004 survived by his wife and two daughters. His widow Pauline died in 2011.

External links

https://www.imdb.com/name/nm0852370/

References

1920 births
20th-century Scottish male actors
Male actors from New South Wales
Australian male stage actors
Australian male television actors
Australian male voice actors